, more commonly abbreviated as R・E・D was a professional wrestling stable primarily appearing in the Japanese promotion Dragon Gate.

The group was formed on September 24, 2018 by former Antias members Ben-K, Yasushi Kanda, Takashi Yoshida, Big R Shimizu, Eita and freelancer Kazma Sakamoto. Since forming, the group has also included foreign wrestlers Pac and Daga.

History 
The group has history going back to 2015 when it originally formed as VerserK, before being renamed to Antias in January 2018. After the group suffered many losses in early 2018, with El Lindaman, T-Hawk and Shingo Takagi all leaving for other promotions, and general poor reception of the stable's second incarnation, new leader Eita announced a complete rebranding of the stable on September 6, and that same night, added Ben-K as the newest member after he betrayed his group MaxiMuM. The group re-debuted as R・E・D. on September 24, and announced new member Kazma Sakamoto. The night of the stable's debut would bring mixed success, as they defeated Natural Vibes in an All Out War ten-man tag team elimination match, but Eita lost the Open the Brave Gate Championship to Dragon Kid. 9 days later, Pac returned to Dragon Gate for the first time since 2012 and aligned himself with the group, teaming with Eita to defeat former Antias and VerserK leader Shingo Takagi and BxB Hulk in Korakuen Hall. On October 21, Eita announced Mexican wrestler Daga as the newest member. On December 4, Pac defeated Masato Yoshino to win the Open the Dream Gate Championship, becoming the first British wrestler to hold the title in the process. On December 23, more gold was bought to the group when Yoshida, Kanda and Sakamoto beat Natural Vibes (Kzy, Genki Horiguchi and Susumu Yokosuka) for the Open the Triangle Gate Championship and Ben-K and Shimizu won a four way match to capture the Open the Twin Gate Championship. In the main event, the feud between Eita and Dragon Kid culminated in a Luchas de Apuestas match, where, as per the stipulation, Eita shaved his head in the ring after failing to win back the Brave Gate Championship. In August 2021, Kazma Sakamoto began appearing in the Gleat wrestling promotion, effectively leaving the group. His profile was removed from the Dragon Gate roster website shortly after. On February 4, 2022, the group was rebranded as Z-BRATS, thus ending R.E.D's tenure as the main heel unit.

Members

Former

Timeline

Championships and accomplishments
 Dragon Gate
Open the Dream Gate Championship (3 times) – Pac (1 time), Eita (1 time), KAI (1 time)
 Open the Brave Gate Championship (4 times) – Eita (1 time), Ishida (1 time), KENTo (2 times)
 Open the Triangle Gate Championship (6 times) – Sakamoto, Yoshida and  Kanda (1 time), H.Y.O., Yoshida, Diamante (1 time), Diamante, Sakamoto and Yoshida (1 time), KENTo, Sakamoto and Yoshida (1 time), Eita, Ishida and H.Y.O. (2 times)
 Open the Twin Gate Championship (6 times) – Shimizu and Ben-K (1 time), Eita and Shimizu (1 time), Hulk and Sakamoto (1 time), Hulk and KAI (1 time), Ishida and Sakamoto (1 time), KENTo and H.Y.O. (1 time)

Footnotes

References 

Dragon Gate (wrestling) teams and stables